Gary William Evans (born November 22, 1948) is the Elizabeth Lee Vincent Professor of Human Ecology in the Cornell University College of Human Ecology. He is known for researching the mental health and physiological consequences of exposure to poverty and stress during childhood.

Honors and awards
In 2006, Evans received an honorary doctorate from Stockholm University. In 2013, he received a Guggenheim Fellowship in psychology.

References

External links
Faculty page

Living people
1948 births
21st-century American psychologists
Cornell University faculty
Developmental psychologists
Environmental psychologists
Colgate University alumni
University of Massachusetts Amherst alumni
20th-century American psychologists